Karim Maamoun (born 18 November 1979) is an Egyptian tennis player.

External links 
 
 
 

1979 births
Egyptian male tennis players
Living people
African Games gold medalists for Egypt
African Games medalists in tennis
African Games bronze medalists for Egypt
Competitors at the 2011 All-Africa Games
Competitors at the 2003 All-Africa Games
Competitors at the 2007 All-Africa Games
African Games silver medalists for Egypt
21st-century Egyptian people